Hashtrud Station ( – Īstgāh-e Hashtrūd) is a village and railway stations in Nazarkahrizi Rural District, Nazarkahrizi District, Hashtrud County, East Azerbaijan Province, Iran. At the 2006 census, its population was 14, in 4 families.

References 

Towns and villages in Hashtrud County
Railway stations in Iran